Slobodan Jovanović, Slobodan Jovanović or Slobodan Jovanovic (Serbian Cyrillic: Слободан Јовановић) may refer to:

Slobodan Jovanović (1869–1958), Serbian historian, lawyer, philosopher, literary critic and politician
Slobodan Jovanović (basketball) (born 1997), Serbian basketball player
Slobodan Jovanović (rower), Croatian rower